English producer A. G. Cook has released two studio albums, one remix album, one mixtape, one extended play and 15 singles. In 2012, Cook released the classical style piano album Disklavier Concert 1, with fellow labelmate Danny L Harle, Spencer Noble and Tim Phillips, under the moniker "Dux Consort". In 2013, Cook released the album Lifestyle with labelmate Danny L Harle, under the moniker "Dux Content". He also released his debut EP Nu Jack Swung. Cook would not release a full-length solo project until 2020, where he released his two debut studio albums, 7G and Apple.

Cook is perhaps best known for his work with English singer Charli XCX, of which he has produced many songs with, as well as served as executive producer for her two studio albums Charli and How I'm Feeling Now. Cook has also produced for the likes of Jónsi, Caroline Polachek, Hannah Diamond, Li Yuchun, among others.

Albums

Studio albums

Remix albums

Extended plays

Singles

Other charted songs

Remixes

Other appearances

Songwriting and production credits

Albums 
As executive producer

Tracks

Mixes

References

Discographies of British artists